Melekhina is a rural locality (a village) in Oshibskoye Rural Settlement, Kudymkarsky District, Perm Krai, Russia. The population was 159 as of 2010. There are 10 streets.

Geography 
Melekhina is located 46 km northeast of Kudymkar (the district's administrative centre) by road. Staraya Shlyapina is the nearest rural locality.

References 

Rural localities in Kudymkarsky District